Rikke Riber Zachariassen (born 1 July 1984) is a former Danish handball who has played for Team Esbjerg since 2005, but stopped her career in 2018.

References

1984 births
Living people
People from Haderslev Municipality
Danish female handball players
Sportspeople from the Region of Southern Denmark